Events from the year 1792 in Canada.

Incumbents
Monarch: George III

Federal government
Parliament of Lower Canada — 1st
Parliament of Upper Canada — 1st

Governors
Governor of the Canadas: Guy Carleton, 1st Baron Dorchester
Governor of New Brunswick: Thomas Carleton
Governor of Nova Scotia: John Parr
Commodore-Governor of Newfoundland: John Elliot
Governor of St. John's Island: Edmund Fanning
Governor of Upper Canada: John Graves Simcoe

Events
 Catherine II grants a monopoly of furs in Alaska to Grigorii Shelikov.
 Captain George Vancouver begins his explorations of the British Columbia Coast.
 Many Black Loyalists in New Brunswick and Nova Scotia migrate to Sierra Leone in West Africa, mainly because the promises of land in Canada were not kept by the British.
 May 7 – Lower Canada is divided into 21 counties.
 August – the 1st Parliament of Upper Canada is elected.
 October 15 – The law of England is introduced in Upper Canada.

 December 20 – A fortnightly mail is established between Canada and the United States.
 December – A bill to abolish slavery in Lower Canada does not pass.

Births
 February 9 – Thomas Cooke, missionary, and the first Bishop of Trois Rivières (d.1870)
 August 29 – James William Johnston, lawyer, politician, and judge (d.1873)

Deaths
 November – Samuel Hearne, explorer, fur-trader, author, and naturalist (b.1745)

Full date unknown
Marguerite-Thérèse Lemoine Despins (March 23, 1722 – June 6, 1792) was a mother superior of the Sisters of Charity of the Hôpital Général of Montreal. (b.1722)
Thomas Peters, black Loyalist and founding father of Sierra Leone (b.1738)

References 

 
92